Ceylonthelphusa is a genus of freshwater crabs endemic to Sri Lanka, where they live in moist lowland forests, swamps and rivers. Many of the species are on the IUCN Red List of threatened species, with the greatest risk factor being habitat loss. Ceylonthelphusa contains these species:

C. alpina Bahir & Ng, 2005 
C. armata (Ng, 1995) 
C. austrina (Alcock, 1909)
C. callista (Ng, 1995) 
C.  cavatrix (Bahir, 1998) 
C.  diva Bahir & Ng, 2005 
C. durrelli Bahir & Ng, 2005 
C. kandambyi Bahir, 1999 
C.  kotagama (Bahir, 1998) 
C.  nana Bahir, 1999 
C.  nata Ng & Tay, 2001 
C.  orthos Ng & Tay, 2001 
C.  rugosa (Kingsley, 1880) 
C.  sanguinea (Ng, 1995) 
C.  savitriae Bahir & Ng, 2005 
C. sentosa Bahir, 1999 
C.  soror (Zehntner, 1894) 
C. venusta (Ng, 1995)

References

 
Gecarcinucoidea
Taxonomy articles created by Polbot